Pachymylus is an extinct genus of chimaera belonging to the family Callorhynchidae. The type species. P. leedsi was described by A. S. Woodward in 1892, and is known from the Middle-Late Jurassic (Callovian-Oxfordian) Oxford Clay of Peterborough, England. Indeterminate remains of the genus are also known from the Middle Jurassic (Bajocian) of France.

References

Prehistoric cartilaginous fish genera
Jurassic cartilaginous fish
Cretaceous cartilaginous fish
Prehistoric fish of Europe
Chimaeriformes